Bogucice is a district of Katowice, in Poland. It has an area of 2.78 km2 and in 2007 had 16,538 inhabitants.

The most eminent piece of architecture in Bogucice is the neo-gothic St. Stephen the Martyr's church, which was consecrated in 1894. The oldest cemetery in Katowice, first mentioned in 1598, was located in Bogucice,  but there are no remains from this period today.

History
The village was probably founded in the 14th century once the first mention of Bogucice dates from 15 December 1360, included in a document of Nicolaus II, Opole-Raciborz Duke, who bestowed the town and some other villages on Otton of Pilica. It became a seat of a Catholic parish in Diocese of Kraków, first mentioned in 1414, but established probably around 1360.

During the political upheaval caused by Matthias Corvinus the land around Pszczyna was overtaken by Casimir II, Duke of Cieszyn, who sold it in 1517 to the Hungarian magnates of the Thurzó family, forming the Pless state country. In the accompanying sales document issued on 21 February 1517 the village was mentioned as Bohuticze.

It was incorporated into Katowice in 1924.

Education
Primary School No. 13
Primary School No. 62
Gymnasium No. 10

Famous inhabitants of Bogucice
Alfons Bialetzki (born 1919), Wehrmacht officer 
Augustyn Halotta, Polish actor
Kordian Jajszczok, Polish ice hockey player
Jerzy Kukuczka, Polish alpine and high-altitude climber
Piotr Łuszcz, Polish rapper

References

External links
Wirtualne Bogucice  – Polish page about the district

Districts of Katowice